Two O'Clock Courage is a 1945 American film noir directed by Anthony Mann and written by Robert E. Kent, based on novel written by Gelett Burgess. The drama features  Tom Conway and Ann Rutherford. It is a remake of Two in the Dark (1936).

Plot
An amnesiac accused of murder searches for the truth with the help of cabbie Patty Mitchell.

Cast
 Tom Conway as The Man, Ted "Step" Allison
 Ann Rutherford as Patty Mitchell
 Richard Lane as Al Haley
 Lester Matthews as Mark Evans
 Roland Drew as Steve Maitland
 Emory Parnell as Insp. Bill Brenner
 Jane Greer as Helen Carter (billed as Bettejane Greer)
 Jean Brooks as Barbara Borden

Reception
The New York Times called the film "a modest little item of second-rate cinematic fun".

References

External links
 
 
 
 
 

1945 films
1940s crime thriller films
American black-and-white films
American crime thriller films
Remakes of American films
1940s English-language films
Film noir
Films about amnesia
Films directed by Anthony Mann
Films scored by Roy Webb
RKO Pictures films
1940s American films